{{DISPLAYTITLE:C3H7N3O2}}
The molecular formula C3H7N3O2 (molar mass: 117.107 g/mol) may refer to:

 ENU (N-ethyl-N-nitrosourea), a  potent mutagen
 Glycocyamine, a metabolite of glycine